The Potter Pond Archeological District is a large complex of archaeological sites in coastal South Kingstown, Rhode Island.  The area is roughly bounded by United States Route 1, Point Judith Pond, Matunuck Beach Road, and the south coast, and includes 22 archaeologically significant sites dating from the Late Archaic through the Late Woodland periods.

The district was added to the National Register of Historic Places in 1987.

See also
National Register of Historic Places listings in Washington County, Rhode Island

References

Historic districts in Washington County, Rhode Island
Archaeological sites on the National Register of Historic Places in Rhode Island
South Kingstown, Rhode Island
Historic districts on the National Register of Historic Places in Rhode Island
National Register of Historic Places in Washington County, Rhode Island